"Fit to Be Tied Down" is a song recorded by American country music artist Conway Twitty.  It was released in April 1990 as the first single from his Greatest Hits Volume III compilation album.  The song reached No. 30 on the Billboard Hot Country Singles & Tracks chart.  The song was written by Walt Aldridge.

Chart performance

References

1990 singles
1990 songs
Conway Twitty songs
Songs written by Walt Aldridge
Song recordings produced by Jimmy Bowen
MCA Records singles